Europe in the Raw is a 1963 American documentary film written and directed by Russ Meyer. The film was released on March 28, 1963.

Cast
Veronique Gabriel
Gigi La Touche 	
Abundavita 
Denise Du Vall
Heide Richter 
Yvette Le Grand
Greta Thorwald
Shawn Devereaux 
Franklin L. Thistle

Production
Meyer shot the film in Europe after completing his adaptation of Fanny Hill. According to Roger Ebert, Meyer "concealed a 16-mm camera in a suitcase and got footage in the red-light districts of Paris, Amsterdam and elsewhere." Meyer later felt the suitcase camera was unhandy and difficult to use, and that he would not recommend making a film in that way again."

See also
List of American films of 1963

References

External links 
 
Europe in the Raw at TCMDB

1963 films
1960s English-language films
American documentary films
1963 documentary films
Films directed by Russ Meyer
1960s American films